Khir Rural District is a rural district (dehestan) in Runiz District, Estahban County, Fars Province, Iran. At the 2006 census, its population was 11,179, in 2,655 families.  The rural district has 14 villages.

References 

Rural Districts of Fars Province
Estahban County